Divinas palabras (English: Divine Words) is a 1977 Mexican film directed by Juan Ibáñez and starring Silvia Pinal and Mario Almada. The film is based on the play of the same name by Spanish author Ramón del Valle-Inclán.

Plot
Mari Gaila (Silvia Pinal), is a lady who lives between ragged, thieves, prostitutes, dwarfs and other misshapen beings, in a rare box at a country and a vague time. Her husband, is a poor sacristan who agrees with other relatives to do business with the display of his orphaned nephew, a mentally retarded dwarf. Caught in committing deception with her lover, Mari Gaila is caged naked and punished by the people.

Cast
 Silvia Pinal ... Mari Gaila
 Mario Almada ... Séptimo Miau
 Rita Macedo ... Benita la costurera
 Guillermo Orea... Pedro Galio
 Martha Zavaleta ... Tatula
 Martha Verduzco ... Marica
 Carmen Flores ... Simoniña
 Xavier Estrada ... Laureano

Comments
This plot of del Valle-Inclán, had given to the young Mexican director Juan Ibáñez very successful when he carried to the theater before his start as a film director with Los Caifanes (1966), striking and innovative film. 
The actress Silvia Pinal revealed: "I was going to do this movie with Luis Buñuel in Spain, but he struggled with the copyright."

References

External links

 FilmAffinity: Divinas palabras (1977)

1977 drama films
1977 films
Mexican films based on plays
1970s Spanish-language films
Mexican drama films
1970s Mexican films